Soul The Hits is the debut album by American girl group the Ikettes, released on Modern Records in 1966.

Background 
In 1960, Ike Turner wrote "A Fool in Love" for singer Art Lassiter. When Lassiter failed to show up for the recording session at Technisonic Studios, Turner had Lassiter's backup singers, the Artettes (Robbie Montgomery, Frances Hodges, and Sandra Harding) accompany Tina Turner on the recording. After the single became a hit, Ike Turner formed the Ike & Tina Turner Revue which included a trio of backing vocalist called the Ikettes. The first set of Ikettes to tour with the Revue were different from the trio on the recording. Hodges and Harding remained with Lassiter, and Montgomery was pregnant and unable to tour. Montgomery joined the Revue shortly after having her baby. The lineup went through many changes, but by 1964, the consistent set of Ikettes were Robbie Montgomery, Jessie Smith and Venetta Fields who are pictured on the cover of Soul The Hits.

Singles 
The album contains six previously released singles. The first single "Camel Walk" reached No. 107 on Billboard's Bubbling Under The Hot 100. Their second single, "Peaches 'N' Cream" became the biggest hit for the Ikettes since "I'm Blue (The Gong-Gong Song)" in 1961. It peaked at No. 36 on the Billboard Hot 100 and No. 28 on the R&B chart. The follow-up "(He's Gonna Be) Fine, Fine, Fine" reached No. 125 on Bubbling Under The Hot 100. The next single, "I'm So Thankful," was an R&B hit (No. 74 Pop, No. 12 R&B). "(Never More) Lonely For You" reached No. 122 on Bubbling Under The Hot 100. By the time the last single, "Not That I Recall," was released in 1966, Montgomery, Smith, and Fields had left the Revue to form The Mirettes.

Reissues 
In 2007, Soul The Hits was reissued on CD with 17 additional tracks by P-Vine Records (catalog no. PCD-93060).

Track listing

References 

1966 debut albums
Modern Records albums
Albums produced by Ike Turner
The Ikettes albums